Assem Orynbay (born 7 September 1993) is a Kazakhstani sports shooter. She competed in the women's skeet event at the 2020 Summer Olympics.

References

External links
 

1993 births
Living people
Kazakhstani female sport shooters
Olympic shooters of Kazakhstan
Shooters at the 2020 Summer Olympics
People from Talas Region
Shooters at the 2018 Asian Games
21st-century Kazakhstani women